Richard D. Bennett (born August 12, 1947) is a Senior United States district judge of the United States District Court for the District of Maryland.

Education and career

Born in Baltimore, Maryland, Bennett received a Bachelor of Arts degree from the University of Pennsylvania in 1969 and a Juris Doctor from the University of Maryland School of Law in 1973. He was in the United States Army Reserve from 1969 to 1975, and in the Maryland Army National Guard from 1983 to 1997. He rose to the rank of major. He was in private practice in Maryland from 1973–1976, 1981–1991, and 1993–2003, serving in the interim periods as an Assistant United States Attorney of the District of Maryland from 1976 to 1980, and as the United States Attorney for the District of Maryland from 1991 to 1993. He served as Chairman of the Maryland Republican Party from 1998-2000.

Federal judicial service

On January 29, 2003, Bennett was nominated by President George W. Bush to a seat on the United States District Court for the District of Maryland vacated by Frederic N. Smalkin. Bennett was confirmed by the United States Senate on April 9, 2003. He received his commission on April 10, 2003. He assumed senior status on June 30, 2021.

Notable cases

In 2011 he presided in the case of National Security Agency Whistleblower Thomas Andrews Drake. He was also the trial judge in Snyder v. Phelps, in which case he was reversed by the United States Court of Appeals for the Fourth Circuit, and ultimately by the United States Supreme Court.

In National Federation of the Blind v. Lamone, 2014 WL 4388342 Bennett held that the State of Maryland’s refusal to provide an online ballot marking tool to enable blind residents to vote privately and independently violated the Americans With Disabilities Act, 42 U.S.C. §1201.  This ruling, called “historic” by the President of the National Federation of the Blind, was affirmed by the U.S. Court of Appeals for the Fourth Circuit in National Federation of the Blind v. Lamone, __ F.3d __ 2016 WL 497187 (February 9, 2016).

References

Sources

1947 births
Living people
21st-century American judges
Assistant United States Attorneys
Judges of the United States District Court for the District of Maryland
Maryland National Guard personnel
National Guard (United States) officers
People from Baltimore
United States Army reservists
United States Attorneys for the District of Maryland
United States district court judges appointed by George W. Bush